Ibragimovo (İbrahim) is a rural locality (a selo) and the administrative centre of Ibragimovsky Selsoviet, Chishminsky District, Bashkortostan, Russia. The population was 344 as of 2010. There are 6 streets.

Geography 
Ibragimovo is located 32 km southeast of Chishmy (the district's administrative centre) by road. Bikeyevo is the nearest rural locality.

References 

Rural localities in Chishminsky District